Fengjiayu Town is a town located in the Miyun District of Beijing, China. It sits along the banks of Baimaguan River within the Yan Mountain Range. The town shares border with Dengchang Manchu Ethnic Township in its north, Bulaotun Town in its southeast, Shicheng Town in its southwest, and Changshaoying Manchu Ethnic Township in its northwest. As of 2020, it had a population of 4,485.

According to local legend, Song female general Mu Guiying had once stayed here for armor repair, and the region was thus named Fengjiayu. Later the name would evolved into Fengjiayu of today.

History

Administrative divisions 
As of the time in writing, Fengjiayu Town consists of the following 19 subdivisions:

Transportation 
Liuxin Road passes through the south of the town, crossing Baimaguan River near Xizhuangzi Village.

See also 
 List of township-level divisions of Beijing

References

Miyun District
Towns in Beijing